David J. Davis (November 22, 1870 – November 19, 1942) was an American politician and military officer who served as the 13th lieutenant governor of Pennsylvania from 1923 to 1927. Davis was a member of the Republican Party.

Life and career 
Davis was born and raised in Scranton, Pennsylvania. He enlisted in the United States Army in 1894, gained a commission as first lieutenant during the Spanish–American War, and deployed to the US-Mexico border in 1916. He entered World War I as a lieutenant colonel and rose to prominence by serving on the staff of General John J. Pershing and as adjutant, colonel, and chief of staff of the 28th Infantry Division. After the war, he became one of the original directors of the American Legion.

Davis served as the 13th Lieutenant Governor of Pennsylvania from 1923 to 1927 under Governor Gifford Pinchot. Following his service as lieutenant governor, Davis served for twenty years as the solicitor of Scranton and, from 1932 through 1935, he served as the adjutant general in command of the Pennsylvania National Guard. He died in Scranton at the age of 71.

References 

1870 births
1942 deaths
20th-century American politicians
American military personnel of the Spanish–American War
Lieutenant Governors of Pennsylvania
Pennsylvania National Guard personnel
Pennsylvania Republicans
Politicians from Scranton, Pennsylvania
United States Army personnel of World War I